Amorntep Konhan (born October 6, 1995) is a member of the Thailand men's national volleyball team. He is a currently playing for Phitsanulok.

Clubs
  Phetchabun (2013)
  Phitsanulok (2015–)

Award

Individual
 2017–18 Thailand League  "Best Opposite Spiker"
 2018–19 Thailand League "Best Scorer"
 2018–19 Thailand League "Best Opposite Spiker"
 2019–20 Thailand League "Best Scorer"
 2020–21 Thailand League "Best Scorer"
 2021–22 Thailand League "Best Server"
 2021–22 Thailand League "Best Scorer"

Clubs 
 2015–16 Thailand League -  Champion, with Phitsanulok
 2015 Thai–Denmark Super League -  Runner-up, with Phitsanulok
 2016 Thai–Denmark Super League -  Third, with Phitsanulok
 2017–18 Thailand League -  Third, with Phitsanulok
 2019 Thai–Denmark Super League -  Third, with Phitsanulok
 2019–20 Thailand League -  Third, with Phitsanulok
 2020–21 Thailand League -  Third, with Phitsanulok
 2021–22 Thailand League -  Runner-up, with Phitsanulok

References

1995 births
Living people
Amorntep Konhan
Amorntep Konhan
Volleyball players at the 2018 Asian Games
Competitors at the 2019 Southeast Asian Games
Amorntep Konhan
Southeast Asian Games medalists in volleyball
Opposite hitters
Amorntep Konhan
Competitors at the 2021 Southeast Asian Games